Argun (Russian: Аргун) is the surname of the following people:

Aleksei Argun, Minister of Culture of the Abkhazian ASSR
Mübeccel Argun (1909–1982), Turkish schoolteacher of physical education, sportswoman and radio presenter at BBC World Turkish Service

Abkhaz-language surnames